Randalls Bay is a rural locality in the local government area (LGA) of Huon Valley in the South-east LGA region of Tasmania. The 2016 census recorded a population of 47 for the state suburb of Randalls Bay.

History 
Randalls Bay is a confirmed locality.

Geography
The waters of Garden Island Bay form the southern boundary.

Road infrastructure 
Route B68 (Channel Highway) passes through the northern tip of the locality.

References

Towns in Tasmania
Localities of Huon Valley Council